EIHS may refer to:

 Ellis Island Honors Society

 Energy Institute High School